Kuzucak can refer to:

 Kuzucak, Ceyhan
 Kuzucak, Sungurlu